Crambus leachellus, or Leach's grass-veneer, is a moth in the family Crambidae. It was described by Johann Leopold Theodor Friedrich Zincken in 1818. It is found in North America, where it has been recorded from Ontario and Maryland to Florida, west to California and Oregon. The habitat consists of grasslands and meadows.

The wingspan is 25–27 mm. The forewings are brown with a silvery-white discal stripe and a row of five dark spots in the subterminal line. The hindwings are smoky white. Adults are on wing from May to September in two to four generations per year.

The larvae feed on grasses. They hide in the grass or upper layer of the soil within a silken tunnel during the day and feed mainly at night. The species overwinters in the larval stage. Pupation takes place in the grass.

References

Crambini
Moths described in 1818
Moths of North America